16 Flight AAC was an independent flight within the British Army's Army Air Corps. It appears to have initially been formed in 1961, and operated in Aden and Borneo. Reformed circa 1982, it was based at Dhekelia in Cyprus, It operated in support of Army units based there. The unit operated Westland Gazelle AH.1 helicopters.

The unit was disbanded in 2000. Its role was taken by No. 84 Squadron RAF.

See also

 List of Army Air Corps aircraft units

References
Citations

Bibliography

External links
 https://web.archive.org/web/20080502012205/http://www.army.mod.uk/aac/units/flights/index.htm

Army Air Corps independent flights
Military units and formations established in 1961
Military units and formations disestablished in the 2000s